Statistics of the Ekstraklasa for the 1997–98 season.

Overview
18 teams competed in the 1997–98 season. ŁKS Łódź won the championship.

League table

Results

Top goalscorers

References

External links
 Poland – List of final tables at RSSSF 

Ekstraklasa seasons
1997–98 in Polish football
Pol